Vi-Jon Laboratories is an American health and beauty care company that produces both Private Label and brand name products. Headquartered in the St. Louis suburb of Overland, they operate five manufacturing and distribution centers in Missouri and Tennessee. The company's products are supplied nationwide to retailers such as Kroger, Target, and Walgreens. Vi-Jon was founded as Peroxide Specialty Company in 1908 by John B. Brunner. Vi-Jon was acquired by investment firm Berkshire Partners in 2006.  In the United States, the company markets a line of hand sanitizers under the brand Germ-X, as well as a line of isopropyl alcohol products under the brand Swan. Both products have become widely sold during the COVID-19 pandemic.

In 2006 Procter & Gamble filed a lawsuit against Vi-Jon alleging that Vi-Jon copied the look of Crest Pro-Health mouth wash; the parties settled a few months later, with Vi-Jon agreeing to withdraw its product from the market, to not use bottle designs that are confusingly similar to those of P&G, to not make "compare to Crest Pro-Health" or gingivitis efficacy claims without specific testing to support these claims, and to pay P&G.

In August 2014, Berkshire announced its intention to sell Vi-Jon As of September 2020, the company became 100% employee-owned.

References

External links 
 
 Germ-X official website (archived)

Manufacturing companies  based in St. Louis
Manufacturing companies established in 1908
Personal care brands
1908 establishments in Missouri
Private equity portfolio companies